Live at Starbucks is an album by Ray Brown.

Track listing
 "Up There" – 4:02
 "When I Fall In Love" – 7:09
 "Brown Bossa" – 3:53
 "Our Delight" – 4:20
 "Lament" – 8:10
 "Mainstem" – 3:53
 "Love You Madly" – 2:33
 "Caravan" – 5:29
 "This House Is Empty/I Should Care" – 7:19
 "Lester Leaps In" – 4:46
 "Starbuck's Blues" – 8:36

Personnel
Ray Brown – double bass, arranger, producer
Geoffrey Keezer  – piano
Karriem Riggins  – drums

Production
 Will Friedwald  – liner notes

References

2000 live albums